Robinsons Galleria South or simply Galleria South is a mall development located in Nueva, San Pedro, Laguna, Philippines. The mall was the first upscale shopping center in San Pedro City. The mall is owned and operated by Robinsons Malls. It is the 3rd Robinsons Mall to bear the Galleria branding after Robinsons Galleria and Robinsons Galleria Cebu. The mall opened on July 19, 2019.

History
Robinsons Galleria South, located along the Old National Highway in San Pedro City, Laguna, is the third Galleria-branded mall in the country following the flagship Robinsons Galleria in Ortigas and Robinsons Galleria Cebu. In 2013, Robinsons Land Inc. initially planned Robinsons Place San Pedro after demolishing the old Cosmos Bottling Plant. After years of delay, the mall construction initially started in 2017 and from Robinsons Place San Pedro, the name was changed into Robinsons Galleria South. The mall opened on July 19, 2019, making it the 52nd Robinsons Mall. This was the company's 10th mall in the Calabarzon region. With a total gross floor area of more than 70,000 square meters, this four-level mall consists of retail shops and a wide array of restaurants to choose from. This was the city's first full-scale shopping center.

Mall features 
The mall feature Eat Streat with a variety of establishments. Galleria South has an area devoted to Japanese and Korean Brand called JK Town, as well as a digital playground called PlayLab, third branch in the country. It has also its very own Catholic chapel named after St. Teresa of Calcutta.
 It is also adjacent Sto. Sepulcro Parish Church home to highly devoted Lolo Uweng.

The four-story shopping center is anchored by Robinsons staples like Robinsons Department Store, Robinsons Supermarket, Robinsons Appliances and Robinsons Movieworld.

The Mall also house to three government satellite offices, Overseas Workers Welfare Administration (OWWA), PhilHealth, Social Security System (SSS) at Lingkod Pinoy Center.

References

Robinsons Malls
Shopping malls in the Philippines
Shopping malls established in 2019